In chemistry, a sultine is a cyclic ester of a sulfinic acid.  This class of organosulfur compounds has few applications.  These compounds are typically prepared by the dehydration of hydroxy-sulfinic acids or their equivalent.  Illustrative of an alternative route, xylylene dibromide reacts with sodium sulfoxylate (source of SO22-) to give the sultine C6H4(CH2S(O)OCH2), which is a precursor to o-quinodimethane.

References

Functional groups
Sulfinic acids
Organosulfur compounds